Penicillium hispanicum is an anamorph species of the genus of Penicillium which was isolated from Citrus limonum in Spain. Penicillium hispanicum produces hadacidin

References

hispanicum
Fungi described in 1978